John Fredrick Thomas Jane (6 August 1865 – 8 March 1916) was the founding editor of reference books on warships (All the World's Fighting Ships) and aircraft (All the World's Airships) and the namesake of what would become Jane's Information Group and many of its publications.

Biography
Jane was born in Richmond, Surrey, England, but worked most of his life in Portsmouth. His father was a Church of England vicar and he attended Exeter School. He first began to sketch warships in his teens, and was notable in the 1890s for illustrating scientific romances by George Griffith and other authors, as well as for his own science fiction novels such as To Venus in Five Seconds (published in 1897) and The Violet Flame (1899).

An avid miniatures wargamer, Jane first published All the World's Fighting Ships (known as Jane's Fighting Ships after 1905) in 1898, which catalogued all the warships operated by each country, their armaments, and other details, as a supplement to a wargame he designed. It was a success from the start and has become the standard reference directory on the topic. The Naval Warrant Officer's Journal suggested that the book be on every ship, and in 1902 said that it should be available to every naval officer. The Admiralty were less enthusiastic, partly due to Jane's irreverent behaviour - although some ships did acquire copies.

In 1909, he created All the World's Aircraft. Jane's firm is now Jane's Information Group.

Jane was an accomplished maritime and naval artist whose works were widely published in periodicals and his own books, those illustrations are now collectable.

He was also involved in politics, standing as an Independent candidate for Portsmouth in the 1906 general election. He was strongly opposed to the Liberal Party (especially its left wing) and when a left-wing Liberal candidate Edward Hemmerde was nominated in 1910, he arranged a stunt to disrupt their election campaign. At another public meeting, Jane arranged for a sailor to ask Hemmerde to insist on the supply of hammock ladders should he be elected: Hemmerde fell for this and gave the pledge. He also once kidnapped Victor Grayson MP in a political stunt.

His Portsmouth home, on Southsea Common, now bears a plaque recording that he lived there.

In later life Jane lived at Bedhampton, and was instrumental in setting up one of the first Scout troops.

After catching a chill while on a speaking tour in December 1915, Jane became ill, and in March 1916, died alone in his apartment from influenza and heart congestion. He is buried in Highland Road Cemetery, Southsea.

References

Bibliography

External links

 
  
 
 The Angel of The Revolution and Olga Romanoff, illustrated by Jane.
 The Violet Flame: A Story of Armageddon and After; written and illustrated by Jane; New York and Melbourne: Ward Lock & Co., 1899
 

1865 births
1916 deaths
English illustrators
English science fiction writers
People educated at Exeter School
Bedhampton
Writers from Portsmouth
People from Richmond, London